Cylance Pro Cycling may refer to:

Cylance Pro Cycling (men's team), a professional cycling team that competes on the UCI Continental Circuits
Cylance Pro Cycling (women's team), a professional cycling team that competes on the UCI Women's World Tour